Jolanta Janek (born 12 February 1963 in Warsaw) is a Polish diplomat, between 1 December 2014 and March 2019 serving as an ambassador to Malta.

Education 
Jolanta Janek was born on 12 February 1963 in Warsaw. In 1986 she has earned her master's degree from the Warsaw School of Economics. She was also educated at University of Warsaw Faculty of Geography (1987–1989) and at the Danish School of Public Administration. In 1984 she defended her Ph.D. thesis on Italian economic miracle.

As researcher, she publishes mostly on the economics and society of Italy and Asian countries.

Diplomatic career 
In 1990 she began her career at the Polish diplomatic service. She started with working at the embassies in the Vatican City (until 1994). Following posts at the Diplomatic Protocol and Western Europe Department, between 1998 and 2002 she served at the embassy in Rome. She was in positions of the deputy director of the Minister Secretary and Asia-Pacific Department (2006–2008).

On 1 December 2014 she was nominated first Poland ambassador to Malta. She presented her credentials on 26 March 2015 to the acting president Dolores Cristina. As roving ambassador, she was residing permanently in Warsaw. In March 2019 she ended her term.

She speaks English, Spanish and French languages.

Works 

 Społeczne konsekwencje włoskiego „cudu gospodarczego”, [in:] Wybrane zagadnienia ekonomiczne Polski, Unii Europejskiej i świata, 2012, Oficyna Wydawnicza SGH.
 Chiny w procesie globalizacji, [in:] Prace i Materiały ISM, nr 39/2011, Kolegium Społeczno-Ekonomiczne SGH.
 Chiny wobec światowego kryzysu ekonomicznego, [in:] Studia i Prace, nr 3/2010, Oficyna Wydawnicza SGH.
 Relacje Unii Europejskiej z państwami ASEAN, [in:] Studia i Prace, nr 19/2009, Oficyna Wydawnicza SGH.
 Włochy wobec światowego kryzysu gospodarczego, [in:] Gospodarka Narodowa, nr 11-12/2009, Instytut Gospodarki Narodowej SGH.
 Rola sektora państwowego w powojennym rozwoju Włoch oraz w okresie boomu gospodarczego w latach 50. i 60. XX wieku, [in:] Kwartalnik KES SGH nr 1/2016
 Społeczne i ekonomiczne przesłanki sycylijskiego separatyzmu od zjednoczenia Włoch do połowy XX wieku. Mafia a kwestia niepodległości Sycylii, [in:] Kwartalnik KES SGH nr 2/1018

References 

1963 births
Ambassadors of Poland to Malta
Living people
Diplomats from Warsaw
Polish economists
SGH Warsaw School of Economics alumni
Polish women ambassadors